The  is a professional wrestling championship created and promoted by the Japanese promotion CyberFight in its DDT Pro-Wrestling (DDT) brand. Open to anyone, regardless of gender or DDT employment status, the championship is defended "24/7", as in any time, anywhere, as long as a referee is there to confirm the win. Because of this rule, not only is the championship winnable regardless of gender or number of individuals (in case of a common pinfall or submission), it is also available to "unconventional" champions such as animals or inanimate objects, with title changes regularly occurring outside of regular shows, often with videos posted on the promotion's social media accounts. The current champion is Akito who is in his sixth reign.

The championship was introduced on the June 29, 2000 TV taping, during which Poison Sawada Black created the title and awarded it to himself. It was created as a parody of the defunct WWE Hardcore Championship, which also had a "24/7 rule". The title is often defended during a 10-minute battle royal, with the current holder not being allowed to leave the match until the end of the time limit; as per 24/7 rules, the championship can change hands during, and not only as the result, of the match. Unlike its name and similarly titled championships, it is not specific to Iron Man matches.

History

On November 2, 1998, Mr. McMahon awarded Mankind the World Wrestling Federation (WWF) Hardcore Championship. As Mankind and hardcore wrestling became more popular with audiences, the Hardcore Championship became a more serious title. Its popularity led competitor World Championship Wrestling (WCW) to create its own Hardcore Championship, a move followed by numerous independent promotions. When Crash Holly won the belt on February 22, 2000, he introduced the "24/7 rule" that the belt was to be defended at all times as long as a referee was present.

On June 29, 2000, Poison Julie Sawada introduced the Ironman Heavymetalweight Championship in DDT as a parody of the WWF Hardcore title and recognized himself as the first champion. Minutes after the unveiling, Mitsunobu Kikuzawa demanded he had a look at the title belt. He then used it to attack Sawada and pinned him to become the second champion.

The 1,000th Ironman Heavymetalweight Champion was crowned on April 29, 2014, when the title belt itself became the champion by pinning Sanshiro Takagi.

Belt design 
The championship belt design features three glittery silver plates on a black leather strap which has a snake skin pattern on the back. The central plate features brass knuckles surrounded by chains in the center. The word "IRONMAN" is written along the edge of the top half and the word "CHAMPION", though partially erased by years of wear and tear, is written along the bottom edge. The two side plates, on either side of the central plate, are rectangular and identically state "24 HOURS" ("24" in silver bordered with black; "HOURS" in red).

Reigns

, there have been 1,563 officially recognized reigns between 395 different human individuals, 7 teams and 44 inanimate objects and animals. The record for most reigns is held by Shinobu, who won it 216 times, including by trading the title back-and-forth with 215-time champion Yuko Miyamoto a total of 303 times on the same night. Danshoku Dino holds the record for longest combined reign with at least 448 days and counting (the exact date of when he won his tenth title is uncertain). Masa Takanashi's sixth reign is the longest singular reign at 333 days. Only 147 individuals have held the title for longer than a day. The title has occasionally been won by unusual means, such as an auction for the belt, rock–paper–scissors, and even a title change that occurred in a dream.

Non-wrestlers to have held the title include AV idol Nao Saejima, TV personality LiLiCo, J-pop idols Akari Suda, Kaori Matsumura, Yuki Arai, Rise Shiokawa, Aika Sawaguchi, Misaki Natsumi, Momomi Wagatsuma and Lingling, Tokyo Metropolitan Assemblyman Shinichiro Kawamatsu, a cat named Bunny, a monkey, a three-time champion ladder, Vince McMahon's Hollywood Walk of Fame star, a copy of The Young Bucks' autobiography Killing the Business, and the title belt itself.

Notable champions
As of November 2022, there have been over 1,500 title changes for the belt, which has been won by numerous male and female wrestlers and non-wrestlers, including children, animals, entire audiences and inanimate objects.

Animals
Yatchan - A monkey
Cocolo - A miniature Dachshund dog
Bunny - A cat

Inanimate objects
Ladder - a steel ladder. Would fall on the champion and a pinfall was counted. Ladder successfully defended the title by not being pinned during the time limit battle royal matches. Ladder was a three-time champion and the first inanimate object to win the title.
Kitty-Chan - a stuffed 'Hello Kitty' doll
Mah-Kun - another stuffed doll, who defeated 'Kitty-Chan' for the belt
A baseball bat - lost the belt after being broken in half as a 'KO' decision
Chiririn - a chicken doll
Mr. Kasai - a stuffed Jun Kasai doll. Mr. Kasai has won the belt twice
A Pro Wrestling Wave poster
Big Japan Pro Wrestling ring truck
Ice Ribbon ringside mat
A pint of beer
Three different sticks of yakitori
Two different steel chairs
"Kōmyō", a calligraphy by actor Akihiro Miwa
The title belt itself
Yoshihiko - An inflatable 'love doll' and the supposed brother of Akihiro. Wrestlers treat it as if it actually was an active wrestler, and actually sell moves "done" by him/her, mostly high flying moves. For some moves, like outside dives, Yoshihiko is helped by one or more assistants, who throw him out of the ring, pull his foot on the ropes, etc. Opposing wrestlers act as if those assistants are not there and are part of Yoshihiko. The original Yoshihiko was "killed" by an Antonio Honda knee drop, which caused its head to burst open, and was replaced by a second Yoshihiko, who was also a 'love doll', only modified to resemble the Great Muta. The second Yoshihiko was killed by Kenny Omega by a giant swing that sent Yoshihiko out of the ring, thus splitting his head open and revealing cotton stuffing. Later on in that match however, a third Yoshihiko came out resembling The Undertaker's old American Bad Ass gimmick, even using the same theme music. Following that match, the third Yoshihiko was shot to death by Antonio Honda. A fourth Yoshihiko, resembling Hulk Hogan, debuted shortly afterwards.
Akihiro, another inflatable 'love doll'. Made its debut on August 18, 2013.
Vince McMahon's Hollywood Walk of Fame star
A bus
TV Tokyo camera crane
Pork bun
A kotatsu table
A trash bin
Pair of chopsticks
RN: Konyamoanokodenuitarou - A printed E-mail
Beer Can - Champion Yukio Sakaguchi drank from the can and fell backwards with the can on top of him. The referee counted the pin. The can lost the belt after Yuki Ueno drank its remaining contents.
 An apple

Non-existent
Arnold Skeskejanaker - An "invisible wrestler" i.e. non-existent. Opponents sell moves of a wrestler who isn't there, and the title is held by nothing and no-one but the wrestlers and referees act as if they can see and pin the "invisible wrestler". Muscle Sakai "won" the title from this "invisible wrestler" by using a "ray gun" and "infrared visor" to shoot the "invisible wrestler", winning the belt on a KO decision.
The Invisible Man - Another "invisible wrestler"

Collective champions
Three elementary school girls (Airi Ueda, Shiori Takahashi and Minami Tanabe)
The Addiction (later known as SoCal Uncensored) (Christopher Daniels and Frankie Kazarian)
The entire audience of Beyond Wrestling's Americanrana '16
The Young Bucks (Matt Jackson and Nick Jackson).  Their autobiography, Killing the Business, was also an inanimate object champion.
Hiroshi Yamato and Toru Owashi
Mizuki Watase, Antonio Honda, Danshoku Dino and Yukio Naya
The 100,000 subscribers to DDT's official YouTube channel

See also
WWE 24/7 Championship – a title with a similar 24/7 rule

References

External links

DDT Iron Man Heavy Metal Championship

DDT Pro-Wrestling championships